The fourth series of the British version of The Masked Singer premiered on ITV on 1 January 2023, and concluded on 18 February 2023. The series was won by singer Charlie Simpson as "Rhino", with singer Ricky Wilson finishing second as "Phoenix", and singer Natalie Appleton placing third as "Fawn".

Production
On 14 February 2022, following the conclusion of the third series, ITV announced the commissioning of a fourth and fifth series. Filming for the series took place in October 2022.

Panellists and host

Following the series' commissioning, it was confirmed that Joel Dommett would return as presenter, with Jonathan Ross, Davina McCall, Rita Ora and Mo Gilligan all returning to the panel.

Stephen Mulhern served as a guest panellist in the sixth episode, Peter Crouch served as a guest panellist in the seventh episode, and Lee Mack served as a guest panellist in the eighth episode.

Contestants

Episodes

Episode 1 (1 January)

Episode 2 (7 January)

Episode 3 (14 January)
Theme: Time Machine
Group number: "About Damn Time" by Lizzo

Episode 4 (21 January)
Theme: Cluefest
Group number: "Viva la Vida" by Coldplay

Episode 5 (28 January)

Episode 6 (4 February)

Episode 7: Semi-final (11 February)

Episode 8: Final (18 February)

Ratings
Official ratings are taken from BARB, utilising the four-screen dashboard which includes viewers who watched the programme on laptops, smartphones, and tablets within 7 days of the original broadcast.

References

2023 British television seasons
The Masked Singer (British TV series)